A yellowbelly (or yeller belly) is a person from Lincolnshire, England. The origin of this nickname is disputed, and many explanations have been offered.  These include:

The uniforms of the old Lincolnshire Regiment were green with yellow facings. The fastenings of the uniform tunic, which were known as frogs, were also yellow.
A species of newt, frog or eel (there is disagreement on this point) found in the Lincolnshire Fens had yellow undersides.
Bacon hung up and stored for a long time turned yellow (reasty).
The backs of farm workers who stripped to the waist in hot weather turned dark brown but their bellies turned yellow.
Opium extracted from poppy heads, and taken to relieve malaria that was prevalent in the fens in earlier centuries, turned the skin a shade of yellow.
Sheep grazing in mustard fields were dusted by pollen from the blossom that turned their undersides yellow.
Women traders on street markets in past times are reputed to have worn a leather apron with two pockets, one for copper and silver and one for gold. At the end of a good day they would say they had 'a yellow belly' meaning they had taken a large number of gold sovereigns.
A folk etymology says that the term originated from Elloe, the name of the rural deanery that serves the fen area of the Lincoln Diocese. This in turn took its name from the Saxon Wapentake which was referred to as þe Elloe Bellie - Elloe meaning out of the morass while bel was the Celtic word for hole or hollow.

See also
Yellowbelly (Copthorne)

References

External links
Lincolnshire people — BBC page; offers a number of explanations for the name.
Nobbut A Yellerbelly — Publisher's page; gives a short description of this book on the Lincolnshire accent, with examples. By Alan Stennett. 
A Lincolnshire Hotchpotch — Extracts from the series of books by John R Ketteringham with that name and similar names

British regional nicknames
History of Lincolnshire